Surrey-Tynehead was a provincial electoral district for the Legislative Assembly of British Columbia, Canada. The electoral district, firstly represented by Dave Hayer (2001–2013), then Amrik Virk (2013–2017).After the British Columbia electoral redistribution, 2015 the riding  became Surrey-Guildford

Demographics historic

Geography

1999 Redistribution
Changes from Surrey-Cloverdale to Surrey-Tynehead include:
Inclusion of all of Surrey-Tynehead, except for portion from Surrey-Green Timbers
Changes from Surrey-Green Timbers to Surrey-Tynehead include:
Inclusion of the quarter sections between 104th and 96th Avenue, and 152nd and 160th Street

History 
The riding was created for the 2001 election from parts of Surrey-Cloverdale, Surrey-Whalley and Surrey-Green Timbers. It was abolished in the 2015 redistribution into Surrey-Guildford, Surrey-Cloverdale and Surrey-Fleetwood

Members of the Legislative Assembly 
Dave Hayer, Liberal (2001–2013)
Amrik Virk, Liberal (2013–2017)

Election results 

 
|NDP
|Pat Zanon
|align="right"|7,257
|align="right"|43.23%
|align="right"|+2.87%

|- bgcolor="white"
!align="left" colspan=3|Total
!align="right"|16,788
!align="right"|100.00%
!align="right"|
|}

|-

|-
 
|NDP
|Barry Bell
|align="right"|9,469
|align="right"|40.36%
|align="right"|+24.64%

|Independent
|Summer Davis
|align="right"|380
|align="right"|1.62%
|align="right"|– 

|Independent
|Gary Alan Hoffman
|align="right"|223
|align="right"|0.95%
|align="right"|– 
|- bgcolor="white"
!align="left" colspan=3|Total
!align="right"|23,462
!align="right"|100.00%
!align="right"|
|}

|-

|-
 
|NDP
|Barry Bell
|align="right"|3,159
|align="right"|15.72%
|align="right"|
|align="right"|$2,502

|Independent
|Marilyn Collins
|align="right"|880
|align="right"|4.38%
|align="right"|
|align="right"|$9,970

|Independent
|Mandir Benipal
|align="right"|50
|align="right"|0.25%
|align="right"|
|align="right"|$1,400

|}

References

External links 
BC Stats – 2001
Results of 2001 election (pdf)
2001 Expenditures (pdf)
Website of the Legislative Assembly of British Columbia
BCNDP Surrey-Tynehead Constituency Association

British Columbia provincial electoral districts
Politics of Surrey, British Columbia
Provincial electoral districts in Greater Vancouver and the Fraser Valley
Former provincial electoral districts of British Columbia